Sandilands (once known as Sutton le Marsh) is a neighbourhood of Sutton-on-Sea, in the East Lindsey district of Lincolnshire, England. It forms part of the civil parish of Mablethorpe and Sutton.

National Trust
The former golf course at Sandilands  is now owned by the National Trust. It was previously an 18-hole links with a par of 70.

Sport and Leisure
A family tennis tournament has been held in the first week of August every year since 1928, excepting 1939–1957. The tournament has taken place at the Grange and Links hotel and also on a number of private courts in the village in 2022.

Gallery

References

External links

Sandilands and Sutton-on-Sea Tennis Tournament homepage

Populated coastal places in Lincolnshire
Seaside resorts in England
Villages in Lincolnshire
East Lindsey District